Kalki Koechlin (born 10 January 1984) is a French actress and writer who works in Hindi films. Known for her unconventional body of work, she is the recipient of such accolades as a National Film Award, a Filmfare Award, and two Screen Awards. Although a French citizen, she has been brought up and lived most of her life in India.

Born in Pondicherry, India, Koechlin was drawn to theatre from a young age. She studied drama at Goldsmiths, University of London, and worked simultaneously with a local theatre company. After returning to India, she made her screen debut as Chanda in the drama Dev.D in 2009, and won the  Filmfare Award for Best Supporting Actress. Subsequently, she starred in two of the highest-grossing Hindi films of their respective release yearsthe romantic comedy dramas Zindagi Na Milegi Dobara (2011) and Yeh Jawaani Hai Deewani (2013), both of which garnered her Best Supporting Actress nominations at Filmfare. Koechlin expanded her career into screenwriting with the 2011 crime thriller That Girl in Yellow Boots, in which she also played the lead role.

Koechlin's continued association with such commercial films as the supernatural thriller Ek Thi Daayan (2013) and the musical drama Gully Boy (2019) sustained her success, as she continued to draw praise for her performances in independent films, including the comedy drama Waiting (2015) and the slice of life film Ribbon (2017). She won further acclaim and a National Film Award for her role of a young woman with cerebral palsy in the coming-of-age drama Margarita with a Straw (2014). Beginning in late 2010s, Koechlin made a transition to web content and appeared in a spate of successful web series. She drew particular praise for her portrayal of a lonely socialite in Amazon Prime Video's Made in Heaven and a self-styled godwoman in Netflix's Sacred Games (both 2019).

Koechlin has written, produced, and acted in several stage productions. She co-wrote the drama Skeleton Woman (2009), which won her The MetroPlus Playwright Award, and made her directorial debut on stage with the tragicomedy Living Room (2015). Koechlin is also an activist and promotes various causes ranging from health and education to women empowerment and gender equality.

Early life and background

Kalki Koechlin was born in Pondicherry, India, on 10 January 1984 to French parents, Joël Koechlin and Françoise Armandie, who came to India from Angers, France. She is a descendant of Maurice Koechlin, a French structural engineer who played an important role in the design and construction of the Eiffel Tower. Koechlin's parents are devotees of Sri Aurobindo, and she spent a significant amount of her early childhood in Auroville. The family later settled in Kallatty, a village near Ooty in Tamil Nadu, where Koechlin's father established a business designing hang-gliders and ultralight aircraft.

Koechlin was brought up in a strict environment in Ooty where she spoke English, Tamil, and French. Her parents divorced when she was fifteen; her father moved to Bangalore and remarried, while Koechlin continued living with her mother. She has described the time that she spent at Kallatty between the ages of 5 and 8, before her parents' divorce, as her "happiest". Koechlin has a half-brother from her mother's previous marriage, and a half-brother from her father's subsequent marriage.

Koechlin studied at Hebron School, a boarding school in Ooty, where she was involved in acting and writing. She has admitted to being shy and quiet as a child. Koechlin aspired to study psychiatry and become a criminal psychologist. After completing her schooling at the age of 18, she moved to London and studied drama and theatre at Goldsmiths, University of London. There, she worked for two years with the theatre company Theatre of Relativity, writing The Rise of the Wild Hunt and performing in plays such as David Hare's The Blue Room and Marivaux's The Dispute. She worked as a waitress on weekends.

After completing her studies, Koechlin moved back to India and lived with her maternal half-brother in Bangalore. Unable to find work there, she moved to Mumbai, where she worked with theatre directors and with Atul Kumar and Ajay Krishnan, the founders of a Mumbai-based theatre company called "The Company Theatre". They were looking for actors for a theatrical festival, Contacting the World, to be held in Liverpool.

Film career

Early work (2009–2010)
After moving to Mumbai, Koechlin auditioned for Anurag Kashyap's Dev.D (2009), a modern-day adaptation of Sarat Chandra Chattopadhyay's 1917 Bengali novel Devdas. In the film, Koechlin plays the role of Leni, a young woman who turns to prostitution after a leaked sex tape scandal. The character was based on Chandramukhi, a pivotal character in the novel, a prostitute who fell in love with the titular character. Kashyap initially rejected Koechlin as she was not Indian, and did not match his visualisation of the character. But he changed his mind and offered her the role after seeing her audition tape. The film met with generally positive reviews and was a box office success. Koechlin garnered praise and a Filmfare Award for Best Supporting Actress for her performance, which was described as "imbued [...] with a touching fragility" and "astonishingly [appropriate]". Others were more impressed by her character's complexity, but thought of Koechlin's performance in the film's first half as amateurish.

Koechlin played a supporting role in the black comedy The Film Emotional Atyachar, her only film appearance of 2010. Co-starring Ranvir Shorey, Mohit Ahlawat, Abhimanyu Singh, Vinay Pathak, and Ravi Kishan, the production opened to mixed reviews. Her performance as Sophie, a manipulative woman who is abducted by two corrupt policemen, garnered mixed reviews from critics. Komal Nahta of Koimoi labelled her performance as average, while Blessyy Chettiar of Daily News and Analysis felt that she was underused. Koechlin had committed to star in I am Afia, one of the four short films of Onir's anthology I Am, but it went into production with a modified plot for the segment. In an interview with The Telegraph Onir said, "as we discussed the subject more and more, both Kalki and me felt that the narrative was becoming too hurried in the 25-minute limit". Koechlin, who was to play the role of an NGO worker in the film was ultimately replaced by Nandita Das, after the change of plot.

Breakthrough and commercial success (2011–2014)
After facing some early struggle for film roles, Koechlin had four releases in 2011, garnering widespread recognition for her performances in them. The first was Bejoy Nambiar's Shaitan, a crime-thriller with an ensemble cast that included Koechlin, Rajeev Khandelwal, Gulshan Devaiya, Shiv Panditt, Neil Bhoopalam, and Kirti Kulhari. She played the role of a disturbed teenager and called it an exhausting experience, saying that she felt drained while trying to, "get into a psyche of someone who does a lot of drugs and booze, has lost her mind a little bit and is very vulnerable". While the character was inconsistently described by film critics as "nightmarish" and "engaging", Koechlin was praised for her performance, with Raja Sen calling her "an increasingly striking actress". Upon release, the film received positive reviews from critics, and earned Koechlin a Screen Award for Best Actress nomination.

Koechlin then starred in Zoya Akhtar's coming-of-age romantic comedy-drama Zindagi Na Milegi Dobara. Akhtar had expressed her wish to work with Koechlin in a prior interview with NDTV, having seen her in Dev.D and the then-unreleased That Girl in Yellow Boots. She played the role of Natasha, a South Bombay girl who works as an interior designer. Koechlin, who took diction classes for the role which required her to speak accented Hindi, revealed that she was keen to do the film because her work in such projects as Dev.D and Shaitan had led her to being typecast in dark roles of prostitutes, troubled teenagers, and misfits. Koechlin's performance was positively received by critics. Gaurav Malani of The Times of India deemed her "excellent", and Raja Sen in his review for Rediff.com noted her as "histrionically strong enough to manage varied roles". Koechlin also received her second Filmfare Award for Best Supporting Actress nomination for her performance in the film.

Koechlin expanded her career into screenwriting with Anurag Kashyap's 2011 thriller That Girl in Yellow Boots. She said that Kashyap asked her to write the script for the film as he was looking for a woman's perspective for the story. Co-starring with Naseeruddin Shah, the film had her play a British woman name Ruth, who travels to Mumbai in search of her biological father. The role was partially based on her own experience as a 'white-girl' in India. Shot in a short duration of thirteen days, the film was screened at the 2010 Toronto International Film Festival and the 67th Venice International Film Festival, among other venues. It opened to critical acclaim, with Koechlin being widely praised for her performance. Giving the film three-and-a-half stars out of four, Roger Ebert wrote that Koechlin "creates a memorable woman who is sad and old beyond her years". Sukanya Verma of Rediff.com described Koechlin as "unrestrained and uncorrupted". NDTV film critic Saibal Chatterjee also lauded the film and deemed her performance as "absolute perfection". Koechlin's final release of the year was the Sanjay Leela Bhansali-produced comedy My Friend Pinto. She played the role of an aspiring dancer in the film.

Koechlin was cast opposite Emraan Hashmi and Abhay Deol (her third collaboration with Deol) for Dibakar Banerjee's political-thriller Shanghai. The film, which was based on the Greek writer Vassilis Vassilikos's 1967 novel Z (made into a movie of the same name), premiered at the 2012 Toronto Film Festival. Koechlin found the role of a political activist, which she described as vulnerable and awkward to be challenging. She said that the character was, "someone who is not an accepted person [...] an outsider". Shanghai received positive reviews from critics, and was a sleeper hit at the box-office grossing over  worldwide. Koechlin garnered mixed response for her performance in the film. While Russell Edwards noted the "biting edge" she brought to the role, Aniruddha Guha thought of her as the "weakest link" in the film.

Koechlin's continued association with commercial films sustained her success as seen, in varying degrees, with both of her 2013 releases, the supernatural thriller Ek Thi Daayan and the romantic comedy-drama Yeh Jawaani Hai Deewani. The former was based on Mobius Trips, a short story written by Mukul Sharma, the father of Konkona Sen Sharma, who also starred in the film. Koechlin's role was that of Lisa Dutt, a Canada-based music teacher who is suspected of practising witchcraft. For her role in the film, Koechlin learned to play the guitar, and lip synced "Yaaram", one of the film's track. Praising Koechlin in her review for the film, critic Anupama Chopra remarked that she was, "an interesting actor but the film doesn't know what to do with her".

Yeh Jawaani Hai Deewani, which also starred Deepika Padukone, Ranbir Kapoor and Aditya Roy Kapur, was her second film appearance of 2013. She played the role of tomboy, Aditi Mehra. Koechlin, who was nursing her hospitalised mother and simultaneously filming for the project called it a "really tough time". Nonetheless, she described her time on the film sets as "fun", and developed a close friendship with Padukone. Koechlin was lauded for her performance and comic timing, with News18s Rajeev Masand writing, "Koechlin invests heart and spunkiness to the part". She earned her third Filmfare Best Supporting Actress nomination for her performance in the film.

Later in 2013, Koechlin appeared in a video entitled It's Your Fault, along with VJ Juhi Pandey. Dealing with the issue of sexual assaults on women, the video mocks the mindset that blames women for provoking rapes. It was created by All India Bakchod, and was released on their YouTube channel. It's Your Fault went viral, with over 150,000 views in two days. Koechlin's sole release in 2014 was Saif Ali Khan's Happy Ending, where she plays a comic role of a girl obsessed with Khan's character. She credited her performance in Yeh Jawaani Hai Deewani for landing her the role. She said that people noticed her comic timing in the film, and that worked in her favour. The film, which Koechlin described as "spoof on our film industry and on all the romantic comedies", opened to mixed reviews and was a box-office failure. Despite the film's mixed reception, she garnered praise for her performance. Saurabh Dwivedi of India Today wrote that "Koechlin steals the show with her perfect portrayal of a nagging girlfriend", and Rohit Vats of Hindustan Times noted that, although her character in the film felt a bit forced, she delivered a "charming" performance.

Critical acclaim (2015–present)
Koechlin starred in Shonali Bose's drama Margarita with a Straw, playing Laila, a young woman with cerebral palsy who leaves her home in India to study in New York City, unexpectedly falls in love, and embarks on a journey of self-discovery. Her character was inspired by Malini Chib, Bose's cousin. Bose first approached Koechlin, who she said was her "first and only choice", for the role when the latter was shooting for Yeh Jawaani Hai Deewani. Due to the clashing schedule Bose went on to audition other actresses to substitute Koechlin, but felt that "something was missing" in each one, and she eventually decided to push the filming for three months to accommodate her. In an interview with the Times of India, Koechlin acknowledged that the role was the most challenging of her film career, and she took six months off her filming schedule to prepare for it. She underwent a six-week training workshop with actor Adil Hussain. The workshop aimed at making her "body language seem natural", while also focusing on the speech pattern of patients with cerebral palsy. Koechlin spent considerable time with Chib and her physiotherapist and speech therapist. She also attended a month-long workshop in Delhi, where she worked on the movement of the body parts. Although the film covers aspects of physical disability, Koechlin dubbed it "a romcom with some hurdles".

Margarita with a Straw premiered at the 2014 Toronto International Film Festival, and was also screened at Tallinn Black Nights Film Festival, BFI London Film Festival, 19th Busan International Film Festival, and the Santa Barbara International Film Festival. The film garnered positive reviews, and Koechlin widespread attention and critical acclaim for her portrayal of a disabled person. While Leslie Felperin of The Hollywood Reporter made a detailed note of her "bravura performance in both physical and emotional terms", Saibal Chatterjee deemed her "[simply] brilliant". Firstposts Deepanjana Pal ascribed her screen appeal to her lack of acting pretense, and wrote "[Koechlin] has done a good job of miming the physicality [...] but what is truly remarkable is the lack of artifice in her expressions". John Beifuss compared her performance to Eddie Redmayne's act as Stephen Hawking in the biographical drama, The Theory of Everything, in his review for The Commercial Appeal. He gave Koechlin the highest praise writing that her performance would have attracted Academy Award notice in a major film studio production. The view was echoed by Variety critic Guy Lodge, who was particularly impressed by her range. Koechlin won several accolades for the film, including the Best Actress Award at the Tallinn Black Nights Film Festival, the Screen Award for Best Actress, and the Jury Award at the 63rd National Film Awards. Additionally, she had garnered nominations for Best Actress at the Seattle International Film Festival and the Asian Film Awards.

Koechlin appeared alongside Parineeti Chopra, Richa Chadda, and Bhumi Pednekar in Y-Films's mini web-series Man's World, a satire on gender roles. The series was released on YouTube in April 2015. She then starred in Anu Menon's Waiting, an independent film about the relationship between two people who befriend each other in a hospital, while nursing their respective comatose spouses. Koechlin played the role of Tara Deshpande, a young and brash social media-savvy. She dyed her hair black for the role, as Menon wanted her to look more "earthy". The film had its world premiere at the Dubai International Film Festival (DIFF) in December 2015, and had its theatrical release in India on 27 May 2016. The film and her performance received positive critical reviews. Sukanya Verma of Rediff.com called the film "absolutely riveting", and also lauded the "stunningly unhindered" Koechlin writing that she used her aura, "in the most mesmeric fashion to create a woman we sympathise with and wish well for". Film critic Kunal Guha thought that film belonged to Koechlin who, "impresses by managing to wordlessly convey her character's state of mind in every scene".

Koechlin appeared in two documentary films in 2016Freedom Matters, a project aimed at spreading awareness on human trafficking, and Living Shakespeare, a BBC production where she drew parallels between Ophelia and Indian women. She was invited to be a part of the jury presided by Hungarian director Béla Tarr, at the 2016 Marrakech International Film Festival. The 18th Mumbai Film Festival saw the release of two of Koechlin's films—the widely praised A Death in the Gunj and the panned Mantra. In the former, she played Mimi, a Kolkata-based Anglo-Indian woman, who seduces a younger disturbed teenager. To prepare for the role, she attended an acting workshop conducted by the film's casting director, Atul Mongia, and also learnt an Anglo-Indian accent. She thought of it unlike anything that she had done before, calling it "a very sexual, beautiful character". The release for A Death in the Gunj was delayed on multiple occasions due to varying reasons. Critics, who were appreciative of Koechlin's performance, variously called her "ever dependable" and "perfect fit".

Both Mantra and A Death in the Gunj released theatrically in the first half of 2017in the months of March and June respectively. Koechlin's following release, the delayed road film Jia aur Jia co-starring Richa Chaddha, focused on two strangers of the same name who embark on a road trip together. Directed by Howard Rosemeyer in his debut, the film was released on 27 October. Critics such as Sweta Kaushal of Hindustan Times and Anna M. M. Vetticad of Firstpost, singled out Koechlin's performance for praise, while negatively reviewing the film. Her final release of the year, Ribbon opened to positive response from critics. Directed by Rakhee Sandilya, the film follows the life of a couple living in Mumbai and the problems that they face with an unplanned pregnancy. Koechlin played Sahana, a sales executive who faces discrimination at the work place; it was variously regarded as the most mature performance of her film career by commentators. Chatterjee was particularly impressed by her "star turn [in] one of the meatiest roles that she has ever played on the big screen".

Koechlin played a French immigrant in Siddharth Sinha's short film The Job. Produced by Kushal Shrivastava, the production was a psychological thriller that was meant to be a critique of the corporate sector and its treatment of employees. Her performance attracted praise with writers ascribing the film's appeal to her persuasive performance. Koechlin was awarded the Order of Arts and Letters by the French government; Alexandre Ziegler, the Ambassador of France to India formally presented the award to her on 23 June. In 2019, Koechlin starred alongside Ranveer Singh and Alia Bhatt in the musical drama Gully Boy. The film emerged as a critical and commercial success, grossing over ₹2.22 billion (US$31 million) against a production budget of ₹400 million (US$5.6 million).

Other work

Stage career

Koechlin has been associated with theatre from a young age. As a child, she attended theatre workshops in Pondicherry. Her mother was adamant that she complete her studies before venturing into an acting career, sending her to London to study drama and theatre. During her years in the film industry, Koechlin has continued to participate in theatrical productions. She has written, produced, and acted in several stage plays in India. In a 2014 interview with Verve she said, "Theater is really an actor's playground [...] There's nothing like performing for a live audience". Koechlin founded her own theatre production company, Little Productions in June 2015.

Koechlin won The Hindus 2009 The MetroPlus Playwright Award along with Prashant Prakash for the play Skeleton Woman which they co-wrote, directed by Nayantara Kotian. The play is a modern adaptation of an Inuit folk tale about a writer; Koechlin played the protagonist's wife. It premiered at the Prithvi Theatre, Mumbai. Asmit Pathare of Mumbai Theatre Guide in his review wrote: "The actors being the playwrights themselves, seemed to know what they were doing". She also co-wrote Colour Blind, a play that attempts to rediscover different aspects of the personality of Indian poet Rabindranath Tagore through his life and writings. In dual roles, Koechlin plays the Argentine writer and intellectual Victoria Ocampo (a close associate of Tagore), and a young woman who is writing a research paper on him. Aditi Sharma of Mumbai Theatre Guide calling Koechlin the "star of the play" noted that she "really put in an effort to build her character and it shows". Koechlin's other early stage appearances include Atul Kumar's Trivial Disasters, The Real Inspector Hound, Ajay Krishnan's Hair, where she plays Rapunzel, and Kapoor's Hamlet, The Clown Prince.

Koechlin made her directorial debut on stage with the 2015 play Living Room. Development of the play began in 2014, when Koechlin wrote a four-page conversation between Death and an old woman who is in a strange surreal space, about to die but unwilling to exit the world. She further worked on the script of the play in 2015. In a 2016 interview with Mumbai Mirror she said, "Last year, when I was unemployed for six months, I started fleshing out the story. It turned into a comedy on life and death". The play was staged at the Ranga Shankara Hall, Bangalore, on 24 July 2015. Koechlin also worked in Rajat Kapoor's What's Done, Is Done, an adaptation of Shakespeare's tragedy Macbeth. She played Lady Macbeth and doubled up as one of the witches for the play. The first show of the play was staged on 5 June 2016 in Mumbai.

Philanthropy
Koechlin identifies herself as a feminist and extensively campaigns for the cause of gender equality. She wrote an article on gender pay-gap for 22 August 2014 issue of Forbes India, and is vocal in her support for the issue: "Equal pay won't happen because there is a hero-based industry [...] need to strive for scripts that empower women, make women our heroes, too." Koechlin has presented several monologues aimed at spreading public awareness, and has used YouTube as a platform or forum for issues that she advocates for. She appeared in Puma's "Do You?" advertisement campaign which encouraged women to, "find their best self". Koechlin, alongside Jacqueline Fernandez and Sakshi Malik led a group of women at an event, organised as part of the movement, to break the Guinness World Record of "Most people to hold the abdominal plank position" for 1 minute. She has been appointed as the ambassador of such campaigns as Vogue Indias "Vogue Empower" and United Colors of Benetton's "#Unitedbyhalf", initiatives aimed at spreading awareness on issues of women's safety and gender equality respectively.

Koechlin was the ambassador for Cottonworld's "Adopt-A-Tree" initiative, under which the brand provided its customers with viable seeds and instructions of planting a tree, urging them to give back to the environment. She endorsed her eco-friendly lifestyle in an interview with journalist Priyadarshini Nandy, ahead of the 2012 Convention on Biological Diversity in Hyderabad. She supported the "Your Cartons. My Classroom" initiative by TERI, Tetra Pak and The Times of India, which promoted the recycling of empty tetra pak cartons into furniture for school classrooms. Koechlin starred in a short film, entitled Hawa Badlo, aimed at spreading awareness on the health concerns of air pollution. She is also a supporter of animal rights, and appeared in a 2012 PETA advertisement campaign encouraging the adoption of stray cats and dogs.

Koechlin advocates for LGBT rights, and has featured in such video campaigns as Jagatjit Industries's IICE Vodka advertisement "Kinki Chilli". Directed by Shiven Surendranath, the video emphasised on an individual's freedom to choose their sexual identity. Koechlin expressed her support to LGBT community in an International Women's Day interview with The Huffington Post saying that education was essential for developing sensitisation to LGBT rights. Video messages recorded by Koechlin and Kunal Kapoor, in which they voiced their support for the LGBTQ community were screened at the 2016 Delhi International Queer Theater and Film Festival. Koechlin was featured on the March 2015 cover of Bombay Dost, India's first gay magazine.

Koechlin is also vociferous on a variety of other issues, including health promotion, education for children in rural areas, and child sexual abuse among others. Koechlin actively participates in the P & G Shiksha campaign for educating children living in rural parts of India. She participated in the 2015 Mumbai Marathon, a charitable event that aimed to spread awareness about issues such as: education, health issues like cancer and AIDS, and senior citizen welfare, accompanied by Shonali Bose's cousin Malini Chib. Having gone through sexual abuse at the age of nine, Koechlin aims to spread awareness around the issue, saying that it was, "important that parents remove the taboo around the word sex or private parts so kids can speak openly and be saved from potential abuse". She also spoke at the All Indian Conference for Child Sexual Abuse organised by actor Rahul Bose's non-governmental organisation HEAL.

Performance poetry and writing
Koechlin began writing poetry during her childhood and has variously performed and recorded self-written poems. A patron of socially relevant poetry, she performed a solo theatrical monologue entitled, Wo-Manologue at a December 2016 event organised by the FICCI Ladies Organisation. She has also sporadically recited An Intense Piece about the Truths of Womanhood, a soliloquy, on such events as the International Women's Day special at the India Today Conclave in March 2014 and the 2016 Kalyani Nagar meeting of the FICCI Ladies Organisation. She recited three separate poems focusing on consumerism, the contemporary society, and a comic nursery rhyme at "Spotlight", a poetry slam in Mumbai. Koechlin was a member of the jury at the 2016 National Youth Poetry Slam, held in Bangalore.

Koechlin starred in a 2016 video, entitled Printing Machine that talked about the approach of media and society towards crimes against women, as a part of Culture Machine's video series "Unblushed". The five-minute video was released on YouTube and featured a poem penned and recited by Koechlin. The video was well received by critics and viewers. She also received a letter of appreciation from Melinda Gates, co-founder of Bill & Melinda Gates Foundation, for her contribution to bringing attention to women's issues. The success of Printing Machine was followed by a second collaborative video for the Unblushed series, Noise, another original poem which was released on the company's YouTube channel on 22 June 2017 (World Music Day).

At the SpokenFest 2017, organised by Kommune India, Koechlin performed a 17-minute act entitled "Fairy Tale". The piece aimed to highlight the "intrinsically faulty" representation propagated by fairy tales. She suggested alternative readings that, among other things, disregarded the notions of a princess "[who] must never displease", a prince, who "has to be gentle and yet be a man" and interpreted a witch not as the "antagonist, but [...] as a strong woman misunderstood by the society". In response to the poem, Ishita Sengupta of The Indian Express suggested a re-reading of the fairy tales "in a new light".

Koechlin's debut book Elephant in the Womb is expected to come out by the end of 2021. This illustrated non-fiction book will trace her personal experiences with pregnancy and motherhood. The illustrations are done by Valeriya Polyanychko and it will be published by Penguin Random House India.

Personal life

Koechlin married filmmaker Anurag Kashyap in April 2011, at her maternal home in Ooty. The two met while filming her debut film Dev.D. On 13 November 2013, Koechlin and Kashyap issued a joint statement addressing their separation. On 19 May 2015, they filed for divorce at a Mumbai family court. During the period between their separation and eventual divorce, the couple went through marriage counselling. Amidst all the news and speculation surrounding the separation, Koechlin revealed that she regretted being so transparent about her personal life, stating in 2012, "It just takes centre stage instead of your work". Since her divorce, she has rarely mentioned her personal life in public. Tabloids have often linked her romantically with other Bollywood stars, but she has strongly denied any such rumours. Koechlin adopted a rescue cat named Dosa.

On 30 September 2019, Koechlin confirmed her pregnancy with her boyfriend, Guy Hershberg, an Israeli musician. Their daughter was born on 7 February 2020 through water birth.

She stated in an interview with Daily News and Analysis, that she was a victim of stereotypes in her teenage years and early film career, where she was stereotyped as a '"white girl" in India. She goes on to say, "Even as an actor, you have days when you haven't slept enough, you don't feel like you're good enough or pretty enough ... But ultimately, it's all about attitude. You must live with a little abandon and not be self-conscious. You ought to stop staring at yourself in the mirror, and just smile a little!" She acknowledged her share of confusion regarding her identity as a "white-skinned woman growing up in Tamil Nadu", who had to defend her "Indian-ness" at numerous occasions. In an interview with The Local, she said of herself, "My skin is white, but my heart is brown." She has a French passport, and stated in an interview that she chose it over an Indian passport as it is easier to travel with the former.

Media image

Koechlin has been acknowledged in the media for her unconventional roles in films and her straightforward personality. Reviewing her work in Printing Machine, film critic and journalist Subhash K. Jha deemed her the "free-thinking actress this industry Bollywood needs". Megha Shah of the GQ called her "someone who can speak her mind, sound intelligent and also look stunning in a bikini". Members of the media have subsequently labelled her as a role model for women across the country. Bhavya Sadhwani, describing her as "a real life heroine", lauded her for "voicing her opinions without an iota of inhibition". Another editorial in The Week stated that with her powerful performances, and by voicing her opinions, she "has always stayed ahead of her contemporaries in the industry".

Following her portrayal of such characters as those in Dev.D, Zindagi Na Milegi Dobara, Shaitan, and Margarita With a Straw, Koechlin gained wider recognition and earned the tag of a "nonconformist". Clarisse Loughrey of The Independent described her as a pioneer for the Indian film industry owing to her unconventional roles and outspoken public presence. Don Groves of Forbes wrote that she has "managed to subvert stereotypes by playing characters who are nothing like each other". The columnist and film critic Vinayak Chakravorty cites Koechlin as one of the "new 'new-wave' actors" who has proved her easy screen presence in her short time in the film industry.

Koechlin is described as a style icon by the Indian media and has been dubbed as the "queen of experimental fashion". Raedita Tandan of Filmfare deemed Koechlin's fashion appeal as "effortless" and "un-diva esque". Such designers and photographers as the slow-process multimedia artist Riyas Komu and Elle couturier Amit Aggarwal have described Koechlin's persona as representative of "a sense of eclecticism" and "fresh, akin to a new wave" respectively. Koechlin has been a part of numerous fashion shows, including the Lakme Fashion Week, India International Jewellery Week, and Mijwan Fashion Show (Shabana Azmi's annual fund raiser). She also made a guest appearance at the Milan Fashion Week, one of the global "Big Four Fashion Weeks".

Koechlin is particularly known in the Indian media and film industry for her dedication to her work. Atul Kumar, founder of The Company Theatre, and her co-star in Hamlet, noted: "her commitment as an actor is relentless". The director Shonali Bose, while filming Margarita With a Straw, said Koechlin was able to give perfect long takes for the film because of the "intense hard work that she put into the preparation of her role". Her former husband, Anurag Kashyap—who directed her in three films—believes that she "has grown as an actor since Dev.D". Rajat Kapoor, in whose Hamlet Koechlin performed as Ophelia, believes she is an actress who has the "sensitivity and understanding of filmmaking and theatre".

Koechlin is a celebrity endorser and has been associated with several brands and services, including: Coca-Cola, Olay, Vogue, Micromax, Titan, Grey Goose's Style du jour, and AOC International including the cosmetic giant Oriflame. In an interview for Asian News International, Koechlin said that she "believes that everyone, whether an actor or a model, should endorse a brand which matches their ideologies". She was also the brand ambassador of the "Cinema For Care" section, aimed at creating awareness about disability issues at the All Lights India International Film Festival (ALIIFF) held in Thiruvananthapuram, Kerala in November 2015.

Filmography

Film

Web series

Accolades

References

External links

 
 
 

1984 births
Living people
People from Pondicherry
Screenwriters from Puducherry
Women writers from Puducherry
People from Nilgiris district
French actresses
French feminists
French film actresses
French television actresses
French stage actresses
French voice actresses
French women screenwriters
French screenwriters
French expatriates in India
Actresses in Hindi cinema
Actresses in Tamil cinema
European actresses in India
Actresses of European descent in Indian films
Hebron School alumni
Alumni of Goldsmiths, University of London
Chevaliers of the Ordre des Arts et des Lettres
Filmfare Awards winners
Screen Awards winners
Special Jury Award (feature film) National Film Award winners
21st-century French actresses
21st-century French screenwriters
21st-century French women writers